In Europe is a live album by jazz drummer Elvin Jones recorded in 1991 in Vilshofen, West Germany and released on the Enja label.

Reception
The Allmusic review stated "Recorded live at a jazz festival in Germany, In Europe represents a typical Jazz Machine live performance, three selections from the group's regular repertoire where the musicians get plenty of room to stretch out, fueled by Jones' propulsive polyrhythms".

Track listing
 "Ray" (Thad Jones) - 17:40 
 "Doll of the Bride" (Traditional arranged by Keiko Jones) - 32:45 
 "Island Birdie" (McCoy Tyner) - 13:02

Personnel
Elvin Jones  - drums 
Sonny Fortune - tenor saxophone, flute
Ravi Coltrane - tenor saxophone, soprano saxophone
Willie Pickens - piano
Chip Jackson - bass

References

Elvin Jones live albums
1992 live albums
Enja Records live albums